Mandera Central Constituency is a former electoral constituency in Kenya. It was one of three constituencies in Mandera District. The constituency has 12 wards, all electing councillors to the Mandera county Council. The constituency was established for the 1988 elections.

Members of Parliament

Wards

References

External links 
Dujis Constituency Online (unofficial)
Map of the constituency

Mandera County
Constituencies in North Eastern Province (Kenya)
1988 establishments in Kenya
Constituencies established in 1988
Former constituencies of Kenya